Quentin Bone FRS (17 August 1931 – 6 July 2021) was a British marine biologist. In 1971, he pioneered the application of electron microscopy to marine life.

Biography
Quenton Bone was the son of Stephen Bone, a painter, writer, broadcaster and war artist, and Mary Adshead, a painter, muralist, illustrator and designer. Educated first at Warwick School, he received his degree in zoology in 1951 from St John's College, Oxford. He became a doctor of philosophy in 1958 from Magdalen College, Oxford.

In 1984, Quentin Bone became a fellow of the Royal Society.

Quentin Bone married Susan Elizabeth Smith (1958). They have 4 sons.

Research
Quentin Bone worked on the histological studies of the fine structure and physiology of aquatic invertebrates and fish. In 1971, he pioneered the use of electron microscopy applied to marine life when he took the first electron micrograph at the Marine Biological Association of the United Kingdom. He unveiled many histological fundamentals regarding life facilitation in aqueous environments.

Other roles
1959-1994: Member of the Marine Biological Association of the United Kingdom
Since 1989: Member of the Institut océanographique (comité de perfectionnement)
Since 1994: Honorary research fellow of the Marine Biological Association of the United Kingdom

Publications
;  Taylor & Francis, with R Moore, 2007, 
Biology of Pelagic Tunicates Oxford University Press, 1998,

Prizes
1999: Linnean Medal
2003: Frink Medal from the Zoological Society of London

References

External links
Quentin Bone at a bonfire, painting of Quentin Bone by his father Stephen Bone

1931 births
2021 deaths
Alumni of St John's College, Oxford
Alumni of Magdalen College, Oxford
British marine biologists
Fellows of the Royal Society
Fellows of St John's College, Oxford
People educated at Warwick School
Quentin
People from Hampstead